Evelina "Lina" Ortega is an American politician. She is a Democratic member of the Texas House of Representatives, representing the 77th District. She won the November 2016 general election and was sworn into office on January 10, 2017. In 2020, she was reelected after running uncontested.

References

External links
 Campaign website
 State legislative page
 Evelina Ortega at the Texas Tribune

Living people
Democratic Party members of the Texas House of Representatives
21st-century American politicians
Hispanic and Latino American state legislators in Texas
Hispanic and Latino American women in politics
University of Texas at El Paso alumni
University of Texas School of Law alumni
Women state legislators in Texas
21st-century American women politicians
1955 births